Acme Markets Inc. is a supermarket chain operating 161 stores throughout Connecticut, Delaware, Maryland, New Jersey, the Hudson Valley of New York, and Pennsylvania and, as of 1999, is a subsidiary of Albertsons, and part of its presence in the Northeast. It is headquartered in East Whiteland Township, Pennsylvania, near Malvern, a Philadelphia suburb.

Acme was established in 1891, when Irish immigrants Samuel Robinson and Robert Crawford opened a store in South Philadelphia. The company today has 161 supermarkets under the Acme name in Connecticut, New York, New Jersey, Pennsylvania, Delaware, and Maryland.

After many decades of being the largest grocery retailer in the Delaware Valley, Acme fell to #2 behind ShopRite in 2011.  As of 2013, Acme was #3 behind #1 ShopRite and #2 Giant Food Stores in the region.

History

Irish immigrants, Robinson and Crawford, founded what is now Acme in south Philadelphia in 1891, according to some sources, with other sources suggesting that it was founded in 1887 or 1872. In 1917, Robinson and Crawford merged Acme Markets with four other Philadelphia-area grocery stores, including English immigrant S. Canning Childs New Jersey-based American grocery chain; the new company was named American Stores. In 1927, smaller rival Penn Fruit began operating in Philadelphia's Center City. In the late 1920s, supermarkets under the American Stores banner rapidly sprouted throughout the Philadelphia region, rivaling New Jersey-based A&P, which then featured downtown stores throughout the East Coast, and as far west as New Orleans. American Stores first introduced self-service stores in shopping centers in the early 1950s.

Identity
In 1961, American Stores created a new logo (known as the "teardrop" or "fish eye"), in an attempt to eliminate the inconsistent use of the Acme Markets or Acme Super Markets script logos of the 1950s; however, its implementation was not carried out throughout the chain. American Stores' distribution center, on U.S. 30 in West Philadelphia, retained the gold script "Acme Super Markets" signage until its closure in 1993. The complex remained abandoned, complete with sign, as the last Acme store in West Philadelphia had been sold in 1980.

 The new Acme logo coincided with a building style known as "A-Frame". These stores were meant to compete with A&P, Food Fair, and Penn Fruit, all of which had trademarked architecture of their own. (Larger chains Safeway, Kroger, and Grand Union competed with ACME as well, but on a smaller scale.) Most Acmes built in the 1960s were a variant of this design. These could be adapted to major streets and shopping centers alike, and averaged . Trademark features included a full peaked roof and signage that resembled the then-popular lava lamp, along with a standardized emergency exit. The latter two elements were retained in Acme's 1970s prototype which succeeded many A-Frame units. In turn, the A-Frame's footprint was very similar to Acme's first standardized building model, which had been rolled out in 1955.

Expansion and acquisition
In 1961, the American Stores company acquired southern California's Alpha Beta chain of supermarkets. Many of Acme's stores in the 1960s and 1970s were paired with a regional drugstore chain, a PLCB liquor store (in Pennsylvania), a Kmart, or Woolco (earlier centers had a Woolworth), and in rarer cases a department store such as Sears or JCPenney. American Stores also bought the Philadelphia franchise rights to the then fast-growing restaurant chain Pizza Hut in 1968. Acme would also acquire a number of stores from Kmart Foods (as did A&P, Safeway, and Kroger); however, in the late 1970s, many recently closed 1950s-era supermarkets in Philadelphia and close suburbs were reopened as independents IGA or Thriftway/Shop 'n Bag. Starting in the 1980s, these independents were overtaken by family chains Genuardi's (later acquired by Safeway and now defunct) and Clemens (also defunct) along with Giant-Carlisle and Giant-Landover in newer suburbs, and modernized Acme, Super Fresh, and Pathmark stores in the city and older suburbs not long after.

From 1978 to 1982, Acme acquired many stores during Food Fair's bankruptcy, including both ex-Food Fair (by then known as discount grocer Pantry Pride) and Penn Fruit units. The bulk of these dated to the 1950s. The former Food Fair/Pantry Pride stores were replaced by or remodeled into stores with the standard Acme prototype of the 1970s, as were many expanded A-Frame buildings and a few former Pathmark (these were former ShopRite) stores. Former Penn Fruit buildings, with their trademark barrel roof, could not be adapted to this model. Even many A-Frames were replaced by the often older but larger acquired stores.

In the late 1960s into the 1970s, Acme introduced a new brand of stores, Super Saver that were high volume, but were in high-crime and low-income areas.  Both chains had the slogan "Acme and Super Saver - you're going to like it here!"  The brand Super Saver was retired in the 1980s, only to be resurrected in the 1990s in the West. Some isolated stores retained the signage into the early 1990s, however.

American Stores were sold in 1979 to the Skaggs Companies which took the American Stores name, moving its headquarters to Salt Lake City. Also in 1979, American Stores announced that it would be closing most of its stores in New York state. In the 1980s, American Stores undertook various acquisitions (including Chicago metropolitan area chain Jewel Food Stores) which ran the Jewel-T chain; it operated in many former urban Acme buildings. In 1995, Acme sold 45 stores in northeastern Pennsylvania to Penn Traffic. American Stores was acquired by major Western and Southern chain Albertsons in November 1999.

In 2006, Albertsons' supermarket holdings were bought by Cerberus Capital Management and SuperValu and divided between the two companies, with Acme going to SuperValu. In 2013 Cerberus, which was operating the Albertsons stores it owned under the name Albertsons LLC, agreed to purchase Acme from SuperValu.

In July 2016, it was announced that Albertsons had entered into a purchase agreement with Ahold and Delhaize Group to replace a Giant store in Salisbury, Maryland as part of the divestiture of stores to gain clearance from the Federal Trade Commission for the impending Ahold/Delhaize merger. The store was rebranded under the Acme banner in September 2016.

Current and future operations
Acme is the third-largest food and drug retailer in the Delaware Valley, where it competes with such chains as Ahold's Giant-Carlisle, Giant-Landover, Food Lion, and Stop & Shop; Wakefern Food Corporation's ShopRite; Walmart and its warehouse club subsidiary Sam's Club; BJ's; Costco; natural/organic products retailer Whole Foods Market; Wegmans Food Markets; Trader Joe's and Aldi; and various smaller chains. Acme was the regional sales leader in the Philadelphia area for decades, and only lost its lead to ShopRite in 2011.

Acme offers online grocery shopping for orders that can be picked up at the store. Before 2009, Acme also delivered to customers through online orders. In 2004, Acme introduced self-checkout stands, where shoppers could scan and bag their own groceries; however, many stores (including acquired stores - see below) have had their self-checkouts removed in an effort to expand customer service. In 2008, many Acme stores began adding hot food bars to the deli section.

In July 2015, Acme's competitor A&P announced it would be filing for Chapter 11 bankruptcy protection for the second time in three years and ceasing operations after 156 years. A&P began placing many of its stores up for auction shortly thereafter, and Acme placed bids on 76 of them, eventually taking the leases to 71 stores in all from A&P's namesake brand and its subsidiaries Pathmark, Waldbaum's, Superfresh, and The Food Emporium. This enabled Acme to expand its footprint in the Philadelphia metropolitan area, where they competed with both Pathmark and Superfresh for business; re-establish its presence in the New York metropolitan area, which had been greatly scaled back over the previous two decades; and return to former market areas in Delaware and Maryland. In addition, Albertsons was able to return to Connecticut with some of its purchases; in 2006, Acme's corporate sibling Shaw's sold off or closed all of its stores in Connecticut. It was also announced in August 2015 that Acme would be taking over a former Genuardi's location in Barnegat, New Jersey; this was made possible by the merger of Albertsons and Safeway, which had owned the Genuardi's chain before shutting it down a few years before, and continued to own the lease on the property. (This store opened February 5, 2016.)  Acme has also completed the purchases of the leases of two closed A&P stores in Boonton, New Jersey, and Patterson, New York, The Boonton store reopened on September 18, 2016, The Patterson, New York, store reopened on August 23, 2016,  as well as an A&P Wine & Spirits location in Riverside, Connecticut.  In April 2016, Acme closed three stores it had operated in Oxford, Pennsylvania; Bridgeton, New Jersey; and Shrewsbury, New Jersey. The Shrewsbury location, however, was essentially just replaced by a former A&P Fresh store Acme acquired as a result of the A&P bankruptcy in Tinton Falls, New Jersey.

Headquarters
The headquarters of Acme are in East Whiteland Township, Pennsylvania, near Malvern. The company was previously headquartered in Center City, Philadelphia, but moved to 75 Valley Stream Parkway in East Whiteland Township in 1988. Acme continued to house some support departments, including its accounting department, in Center City.

Brands
The following are store brands that are currently sold at Acme Markets, or have been sold at Acme Markets:

Currently sold:
 Lancaster Brand Meats
 Lucerne Dairy Farms (acquired with Safeway)
 Ivins' Famous Spiced Wafers
 "O" Organic (acquired with Safeway)
 Open Nature (acquired with Safeway)
 Signature Kitchens (Albertsons/Safeway brand, previously Safeway Kitchens; now part of "Signature" brand collection; roll-out started in April 2016.  Brand being phased out in favor of Signature Select)
 Signature Care (Albertsons/Safeway brand, previously Safeway Care; now part of "Signature" brand collection; roll-out started in April 2016)
 Signature Farms (Albertsons/Safeway brand, previously Safeway Farms; now part of "Signature" brand collection; roll-out started in April 2016)
 Signature Cafe (Albertsons/Safeway brand; roll-out started in April 2016)
 Signature Select (acquired with Safeway, previously Safeway Select; now part of "Signature" brand collection)
 Signature Home (Albertsons/Safeway brand, previously Safeway Home; now part of "Signature" brand collection; roll-out started in April 2016.  Brand being phased out in favor of Signature Select and Signature Care)
 The Snack Artist (acquired with Safeway.  Brand being phased out in favor of Signature Select)
 Value Corner (acquired with Safeway, when brand was known as Pantry Essentials)

Formerly sold or phased-out:
 Acme (American Stores/Albertsons/Supervalu)
 Alpha Beta (former sister chain; only sold in Super Saver-bannered locations)
 Baby Basics (Albertsons/Supervalu)
 Bala Club (American Stores)
 Bright Green (Safeway.  Brand merged into Open Nature)
 Culinary Circle (Supervalu)
 Econo Buy (American Stores)
 Equaline (Supervalu)
 Essensia (Albertsons/Supervalu)
 Essential Everyday (Supervalu)
 Farmdale (American Stores)
 Gold Seal (American Stores)
 HomeLife (Supervalu)
 Ideal (American Stores)
 Louella (American Stores)
 Market Fresh (Supervalu)
 Osco (American Stores)
 President's Choice (American Stores)
 Refreshe (Safeway)
 Sav-on Osco by Albertsons (Albertsons)
 Shoppers Value (Supervalu)
 Speedup (American Stores)
 Super Chill (Supervalu)
 Supreme (American Stores)
 Virginia Lee (American Stores)
 Wild Harvest (Supervalu)

In popular culture

The Acme name was used for a fictional corporation in many Warner Bros. cartoons, such as Road Runner/ Wile E. Coyote in the 1940s onward. Acme was a popular name for businesses at the time. The name was not only used for fictional markets, but drugs, delivery services, anvils, and even traffic signal companies. Today, the Acme name is most commonly associated with the Northeastern supermarket corporation, Acme Markets.

See also

Giant Food Stores
Genuardi's
Safeway
Costco
The Great Atlantic & Pacific Tea Company
Pathmark
Super Fresh
Wegmans
Weis Markets

References

External links

Acme
Acme stores architecture

Companies based in Philadelphia
Companies based in Chester County, Pennsylvania
Retail companies established in 1891
Culture of Philadelphia
Irish-American culture in Philadelphia
Skaggs family
Supermarkets of the United States
1891 establishments in Pennsylvania
Cerberus Capital Management companies
1999 mergers and acquisitions